Isocoma arguta is a rare species of flowering plant in the family Asteraceae known by the common name Carquinez goldenbush. It has been found only in Solano and Contra Costa Counties in California, where it grows in the Sacramento-San Joaquin River Delta. It is a resident of Suisun Marsh. It thrives on alkali flats and other mineral-rich soils.

Description
Isocoma arguta is a compact subshrub reaching about half a meter-1.5 feet (20-60 inches) tall and wide with erect, multibranched stems.

The inflorescences hold clusters of thick, knobby flower heads. Each head is a capsule of layered greenish glandular phyllaries with an array of 10-13 cylindrical, protruding golden yellow disc florets at one end. There are no ray florets.

References

External links
Calflora Database: Isocoma arguta (Carquinez goldenbush,  Carquinez isocoma)
Jepson Manual eFlora (TJM2) treatment of Isocoma arguta
UC CalPhotos gallery − Isocoma arguta

arguta
Endemic flora of California
Natural history of Solano County, California
Natural history of the Central Valley (California)
Endemic flora of the San Francisco Bay Area
Plants described in 1894
Taxa named by Edward Lee Greene
Critically endangered flora of California